Luis Alfonso Rodríguez López-Cepero (born April 15, 1978), known by his stage name Luis Fonsi, is a Puerto Rican singer. He is known for multiple songs, one of them being "Despacito" featuring rapper Daddy Yankee.

Fonsi received his first Latin Grammy Award nominations in the Record of the Year category and won Song of the Year thanks to the song "Aquí Estoy Yo". The song also won three Billboard Latin Music Awards. "Despacito" became Fonsi's biggest success, winning four Latin Grammy Awards, seven Billboard Latin Music Awards, five Billboard Music Awards and three Grammy Awards nominations. He also won one Latin American Music Award for "Échame la Culpa" with Demi Lovato.

As of 2018, Fonsi has broken six Guinness World Records and sold more than 11 million records with "Despacito", whose music video was the most-watched YouTube video of all time until November 2020, with over 7 billion views.

Early life 
Fonsi was born on April 15, 1978 in San Juan, Puerto Rico, the oldest child of Alfonso Rodríguez and Delia López-Cepero. He has two younger siblings: Jean Rodríguez, who also is a singer, and Tatiana Rodríguez.

Growing up, Fonsi idolized the stars of the popular group Menudo, and the San Juan Children's Choir.

At the age of 10, his family decided to move from Puerto Rico and relocated to Orlando, Florida. He attended Westridge Middle School and Dr. Phillips High School, both in Orlando. During his high school years, he participated in an a cappella group called "The Big Guys". They sang at school parties and local festivals. One of the members of the group, Joey Fatone, later joined *NSYNC.

In 1995, Fonsi enrolled at Florida State University School of Music on a full scholarship, He also joined the school's choir, the Florida State University Singers, and sang with the City of Birmingham Symphony Orchestra. Eventually, he dropped out in order to pursue a career in music. Soon after, he was offered a recording contract by Universal Music Latin.

Career

1997–2006: Early albums 

In 1997, Fonsi recorded his debut album, Comenzaré (I Will Begin), released in 1998. The record peaked at number 11 on Billboards Top Latin Albums chart and contained the singles "Si Tú Quisieras", "Perdóname", "Dime Como", and "Me Iré". Comenzaré became a hit in Puerto Rico and across Latin America, with Fonsi doing well in markets like Colombia, the Dominican Republic, El Salvador, Mexico, and Venezuela. His 2000 follow-up, Eterno, was even more successful. Around this time, Fonsi also recorded a duet with Christina Aguilera for her 2000 Spanish-language album, Mi Reflejo. On May 1, 2000, Fonsi performed at the Great Jubilee Concert for a Debt-Free World, an outdoor concert in Rome, attended by Pope John Paul II. That same year, Ednita Nazario won a Latin Grammy Award for a song composed by Fonsi. He also performed, with other artists, at the White House in honor of the victims of the September 11 attacks.

In 2002, Fonsi was the opening act for Britney Spears' Dream Within a Dream Tour in the US and Mexico. In the same year he debuted his English album "Fight The Feeling" trying to do a crossover with the first single "Secret" featuring Joey Fatone in the video. In 2003, Luis Fonsi performed to billions of viewers across the globe at Miss World 2003 in China.

His fifth CD, Abrazar la vida, sold very well, which opened new markets in Europe. "¿Quién Te Dijo Eso?" reached number one on the Billboard Latin charts. During his time in the studio for the next album, Fonsi recorded "Amazing", a duet with Spice Girl Emma Bunton for her 2004 album Free Me. His sixth CD, Paso a Paso, debuted at number one and sent him into international markets. "Nada Es Para Siempre" also reached number one on the music charts, and was a nominee for the Latin Grammy Awards. In 2006, he contributed to El Piruli, a tribute album honoring Víctor Yturbe, singing a classic bolero, "Historia de un Amor".

2007–2015: Palabras del Silencio, Tierra Firme, and 8 
In 2007, Luis Fonsi was selected to be part of the jury of the new version of the Latino boy band Menudo. The band would be a fusion of urban, pop and rock music in English and Spanish to produce several albums with the label of Sony BMG Epic Records. Several auditions were held in different cities such as Los Angeles, Dallas, Miami, New York, among others. Fonsi was a part of the Dallas competition where along the side of radio announcer Daniel Luna they chose various contestants and in their pickings, rising star JC Gonzalez was 1 of the 25 selected.

His seventh CD, Palabras del Silencio, debuted and stayed in the number one position for many weeks. Luis Fonsi entered the US Billboard Hot 100 for the first time in September 2008 with his song "No Me Doy por Vencido", debuting at number 98 and peaking at number 92. It reached number one on the Billboard Hot Latin Tracks chart, one of his biggest hits to date. "No Me Doy por Vencido" became Billboards "Latin Pop Song of the Decade", and spent 21 weeks at number one on the Hot Latin Songs chart.

In November 2009, Luis Fonsi was awarded a Latin Grammy Award for "Song of the Year" for his composition "Aquí Estoy Yo".

On December 11, 2009, Fonsi performed at the Nobel Peace Prize Concert in Oslo, honoring recipient President Barack Obama.

In 2011, Fonsi released the album Tierra Firme, and went on tour to promote it throughout Latin America.

On July 9, 2011, Billboard named Fonsi "Leader of Latin Music's New Generation".

In 2014, Fonsi released his album 8, a reference to his eighth career album. He then did a tour named "Somos Uno" in 2014–15. He also mentioned that acting would be on his career path and that he wouldn't mind acting with Mexican actors and actresses.

2017–present: "Despacito" and international success

In January 2017, "Despacito" featuring Daddy Yankee was promoted and released. On April 5, 2018, the music video reached five billion views on YouTube, with the song becoming number one in nearly every Latin Billboard chart, and the most viewed video in the world. In April 2017, the song was given an English remix featuring Canadian singer Justin Bieber. The remix featuring Bieber reached number one on the US Billboard Hot 100 for the week ending May 27, 2017, becoming both Fonsi and Yankee's first number one on the chart, and Bieber's fifth. Bieber promoted the remix at one of his shows in Puerto Rico, inviting Fonsi onto stage to perform the duet with him. The song remained number one for 16 consecutive weeks, tying One Sweet Day, by Mariah Carey and Boyz II Men as the longest reigning top song in the chart's history.

On August 15, 2017, Fonsi was named the tourism ambassador of Puerto Rico.

In November 2017, he released the song "Échame la Culpa", featuring Demi Lovato, which debuted at number three on the Hot Latin chart. The song won Song of the Year at the Latin American Music Awards of 2018 and received one nomination for Best Latin at the MTV Video Music Awards. As of 2018, the song had sold more than 1 million copies worldwide.

In June 2018, Fonsi released the single "Calypso", with Stefflon Don. The song peaked at number 11 on the Hot Latin chart. On November 2, 2018, he collaborated on the track  "Baby" by Clean Bandit from their second studio album. The song peaked at number 13 on the Billboard Hot Dance/Electronic Songs chart and at number 15 on the UK Singles Chart.

In October 2018, he collaborated with Italian singer Eros Ramazzotti for the song "Per le strade una canzone", from the album Vita ce n'è.

On January 13, 2019, the singer joined with Wisin, Alejandra Guzmán and Carlos Vives as coaches of the first Spanish season of La Voz by Telemundo.

After five years since 8, on February 1, 2019 his 10th studio album, Vida was released. The track list contains "Despacito (Remix) ", "Échame la Culpa" and "Sola". The album topped the Billboard Top Latin Albums chart and Spanish albums chart, and entered at number 18 on the Billboard 200.

In 2019, Fonsi performed "Right Where I'm Supposed to Be" as the official song of the 2019 Special Olympics World Summer Games in Abu Dhabi, United Arab Emirates in collaboration with Ryan Tedder, Avril Lavigne, Hussain Al Jassmi, Assala Nasri and Tamer Hosny.

On July 26, 2019, Fonsi performed at the opening ceremony of the 2019 Pan American Games in Lima, Peru. He sang his songs including his worldwide hit "Despacito" at the ceremony.

Film and television appearances 
In 1992, Fonsi made a brief cameo in the romance film Como Agua Para Chocolate in which he played the friend of the male lead, Pedro Múzquiz.

In 2004, Fonsi made his second acting appearance on the Mexican telenovela named Corazones al límite in which he played Roy. He also had a special appearance in 2001 on the Nickelodeon television series Taina. Fonsi joined the cast of Broadway's Forever Tango for a two-week engagement in August 2013

Personal life 
In 2003, Fonsi started to become romantically interested in actress Adamari López, who, as a Univision artist and fellow Puerto Rican, constantly found herself near Fonsi. That same year, Fonsi released the song "Abrazar la vida" ("To Embrace the Life"), off the eponymous album. The song would later become one of López's favorites.

During 2005, Fonsi was in the middle of an international tour that was abruptly cancelled when López was diagnosed with cancer. Fonsi promised to stay by her side, and traveled with her to Mexico, Miami, and Puerto Rico for various treatment and work-related trips. She had been in remission since 2006.

On June 3, 2006, Fonsi and Adamari López were married in a religious ceremony in Guaynabo, Puerto Rico, attended by many celebrities including Joey Fatone, Charytín Goyco, Ednita Nazario and Carlos Ponce, as well as his brother Jean Rodríguez. On November 8, 2010, they officially divorced.

Fonsi and Spanish model Águeda López were married on September 10, 2014, after three years of living together. They had their first child together, a daughter, in December 2011 in Miami. On December 20, 2016, they welcomed their second child, a son.<ref>{{Cite web|url=http://www.univision.com/entretenimiento/el-bebe-de-luis-fonsi-y-agueda-lopez-nacio-el-mismo-dia-que-mikaela-su-primogenita |title = El bebé de Luis Fonsi y Águeda López nació el mismo día que Mikaela, su primogénita| website = univision.com|access-date = February 11, 2018}}</ref>

Philanthropy

Since 2008, Luis Fonsi has been an ambassador of St. Jude Children's Research Hospital, which fights against childhood cancer. In 2017, the Billboard Latin Music Awards honored him with the Spirit of Hope Award for his humanitarian work.

After Hurricane Maria struck Puerto Rico and the Dominican Republic in 2017, the singer became one of the major helpers to raise the islands from the devastation. For his contribution, he was honored with the Global Gift Philanthropy Award.

He is also a supporter of spreading Latin culture around the world.

 Discography 

Studio albumsComenzaré (1998)Eterno (2000)Amor Secreto (2002)Fight the Feeling (2002)Abrazar la vida (2003)Paso a Paso (2005)Palabras del Silencio (2008)Tierra Firme (2011)8 (2014)Vida (2019)Ley de Gravedad (2022)

 Tours 

 Comenzaré Tour (1998–99)
 Eterno Tour (2000–01)
 Amor Secreto Tour (2002)
 Abrazar La Vida Tour (2003–04)
 Paso a Paso Tour (2005–06)
 Palabras del Silencio Tour (2009–10)
 Tierra Firme Tour (2011–13)
 Somos Uno Tour (2014–15)
 Love + Dance World Tour (2017–18)
 Vida World Tour (2019)
 Noche Perfecta (2022)

 Awards and nominations 

 American Music Awards 

|-
| rowspan="4"|2017
|Luis Fonsi
|Favorite Latin Artist
|
|-
|rowspan="3"|"Despacito"
|Collaboration of the Year
|
|-
|Favorite Pop/Rock Song
|
|-
|Video of the Year
|
|}

ASCAP Awards
El Premio ASCAP

|-
| align="center"|2019
| "Échame la Culpa" 
| Award Winning Songs 
|  
|}

 Billboard Music Award 

|-
|rowspan=7|2018
|Luis Fonsi
|Top Latin Artist
|
|-
|rowspan=6|"Despacito" 
|Top Hot 100 Song
|
|-
|Top Selling Song
|
|-
|Top Streaming Song (Audio)
|
|-
|Top Streaming Song (Video)
|
|-
|Top Collaborate
|
|-
|Top Latin Song
|
|}

 Billboard Latin Music Award 

|-
|rowspan="2"|2006
|"Nada Es Para Siempre"
|Latin Pop Airplay Song of the Year – Male
|
|-
|"Paso A Paso"
|Latin Pop Album of the Year – Male
|
|-
|rowspan="5"|2009
|Luis Fonsi
|Your World Award (Premio Tu Mundo)
|
|-
|rowspan="3"|"No Me Doy Por Vencido"
|Hot Latin Song of the Year
|
|-
|Hot Latin Song of the Year- Male
|
|-
|Latin Pop Airplay Song of the Year, Male
|
|-
|"Palabras del Silencio"
|Latin Pop Album of the Year, Solo
|
|-
|rowspan=4|2010
|rowspan=3|Luis Fonsi
|Artist of the Year
|
|-
|Latin Pop Airplay Artist of the Year, Male
|
|-
|Latin Pop Albums Artist of the Year, Solo
|
|-
|rowspan=1|"Aqui Estoy Yo"
|Latin Pop Airplay Song of the Year
|
|-
|rowspan=10|2018
|rowspan=4|Luis Fonsi
|Artist of the Year
|
|-
|Hot Latin Songs Artist of the Year, Male
|
|-
|Latin Pop Artist of the Year, Solo
|
|-
|Songwriter of the Year 
|
|-
|rowspan=6|"Despacito" 
|Hot Latin Song of the Year
|
|-
|Hot Latin Song of the Year, Vocal Event
|
|-
|Airplay Song of the Year
|
|-
|Digital Song of the Year
|
|-
|Streaming Song of the Year
|
|-
|Latin Pop Song of the Year
|
|-
|2019
|"Echáme La Culpa" 
|Latin Pop Song of the Year
|
|-
|rowspan=4|2020
|Luis Fonsi
|Latin Pop Artist of the Year, Solo
|
|-
|"Date La Vuelta" 
|Latin Pop Song of the Year
|
|-
|rowspan=2|"Vida"
|Top Latin Album of the Year
|
|-
|Latin Pop Album of the Year
|
|-
|}

BMI Awards

|-
|rowspan=4| 2018
|Luis Fonsi
|President's Award
|
|-
|rowspan=2| "Despacito (Remix)"
|Contemporary Latin Song of the Year
|
|-
|rowspan=2|Award Winning Songs
|
|-
|"Despacito"
|
|}

 Grammy Awards 

|-
|rowspan=1| 2009
|rowspan=1| Palabras del Silencio| Best Latin Pop Album
|
|-
|rowspan=3| 2018
|rowspan=3| "Despacito (Remix)"
| Record of the Year
|
|-
| Song of the Year
|
|-
| Best Pop Duo/Group Performance
|
|-
| 2020
| Vida|  Best Latin Pop Album
| 
|}

Heat Latin Music Awards

|-
|rowspan=2| 2019
| Luis Fonsi
| Best Male Artist
| 
|-
| "Échame La Culpa" 
| Best Video
| 
|}

iHeartRadio Music Awards

|-
|rowspan=6| 2018
|rowspan=3| "Despacito (Remix)"
|Song of the Year
|
|-
|Best Collaboration
|
|-
|Best Remix
|
|-
| Luis Fonsi
|Latin Artist of the Year
|
|-
|rowspan=2| "Despacito"
|Latin Song of the Year
|
|-
|Best Lyrics
|
|-
|2019
|"Échame la Culpa" 
|Latin Song of the Year 
|
|-
|}

 iHeartRadio Titanium Awards 

 Latin America Music Awards 

|-
|rowspan=5|2017
|rowspan=2|Luis Fonsi
|Artist of the Year
|
|-
|Favorite Pop/Rock Male Artist
|
|-
|rowspan=3|"Despacito" 
|Song of the Year
|
|-
|Favorite Pop/Rock Song
|
|-
|Favorite Collaboration
|
|-
|rowspan=4|2018
|rowspan=2|Luis Fonsi
|Artist of the Year
|
|-
|Favorite Pop Artist
|
|-
|rowspan=2|"Échame La Culpa" 
|Song of the Year
|
|-
|Favorite Pop Song
|
|-
|rowspan=4|2019
|rowspan=1|Luis Fonsi
|Favorite Pop Artist
|
|-
|rowspan=2|"Vida"
|Album of the Year
|
|-
|Favorite Pop Album
|
|-
|"Imposible" 
|Favorite Pop Song
|
|-
|}

 Latin Grammy Awards 

|-
|-
|rowspan=1|2009
|rowspan=1|"Aquí Estoy Yo" 
|Song of the Year
|
|-
|rowspan=4|2017
|rowspan=2|"Despacito" 
|Record of the Year
|
|-
|Best Short Form Music Video
|
|-
|"Despacito" 
|Song of the Year
|
|-
|"Despacito" 
|Best Urban/Fusion Performance
|
|-
|rowspan=1|2019
|Vida|Album of the Year
|
|}

 LOS40 Music Awards 

|-
|rowspan=5|2017
|Luis Fonsi
|Best Latin Artist
|
|-
|rowspan=4|"Despacito" 
|International Song of the Year
|
|-
|International Video of the Year
|
|-
|LOS40 Global Show Award
|
|-
|Golden Music Awards
|
|}

 MTV Europe Music Awards 

|-
|2017
|"Despacito" 
|Best Song
|
|}

 MTV Millennial Awards 

|-
|rowspan=2|2017
|rowspan=2|"Despacito" 
|Collaboration of the Year
|
|-
|Best Party Anthem
|
|-
|2018
|"Échame La Culpa" 
|Hit of the Year
|
|}

 MTV Video Music Awards 

|-
|2017
|"Despacito" 
|Summer Song
|
|-
|2018
|"Échame La Culpa" 
|Best Latin
|
|}

 Premio Lo Nuestro 

|-
|rowspan=2|2005
|Luis Fonsi
|Male Artist of the Year – Pop
|
|-
|"Abrazar la Vida"
|Album of the Year – Pop
|
|-
|rowspan=4|2006
|Luis Fonsi
|Male Artist of the Year – Pop
|
|-
|rowspan=2|"Nada Es Para Siempre"
|Song of the Year – Pop
|
|-
|Video of the Year
|
|-
|"Paso a Paso"
|Album of the Year – Pop
|
|-
|rowspan=2|2007
|Luis Fonsi
|Male Artist of the Year – Pop
|
|-
|"Por Una Mujer"
|Song of the Year – Pop
|
|-
|rowspan=1|2009
|rowspan=3|Luis Fonsi
|Male Artist of the Year – Pop
|
|-
|rowspan=4|2010
|Artist of the Year
|
|-
|Male Artist of the Year – Pop
|
|-
|rowspan=2|"Aquí Estoy Yo"
|Collaboration of the Year
|
|-
|Song of the Year – Pop
|
|-
|rowspan=1|2012
|"Respira"
|Video of the Year 
|
|-
|rowspan=1|2013
|Luis Fonsi
|Male Artist of the Year – Pop
|
|-
|rowspan=1|2016
|"Llegaste Tú" 
|Pop Song of the Year
|
|-
|rowspan=1|2019
|"Calypso" 
|Crossover Collaboration of the Year
|
|-
|rowspan=5|2020
|rowspan=2|Luis Fonsi
|Pop/Rock Artist of the Year
|
|-
|Pop/Ballad Artist of the Year
|
|-
|rowspan=2|"Imposible" 
|Pop/Rock Collaboration of the Year
|
|-
|rowspan=2|Urban/Pop Song of the Year
|
|-
|"Date La Vuelta" 
|
|-
|}

Swiss Music Awards
The Swiss Music Awards are presented the Press Play Association in conjunction with Media Control Switzerland to national and international musicians in over ten categories. 

 Teen Choice Awards 

|-
|rowspan=4|2017
|Luis Fonsi
|Choice Latin Artist
|
|-
|rowspan=3|"Despacito" 
|Choice Music Single – Male Artist
|
|-
|Choice Latin Song
|
|-
|Choice Summer Song
|
|-
|rowspan=2|2018
|Luis Fonsi
|Choice Latin Artist
|
|-
|"Échame La Culpa" 
|Choice Latin Song
|
|}

 Premios Juventud 

|-
|rowspan=3|2006
|rowspan=2|Luis Fonsi
|Favorite Pop Star
|
|-
|He's Got Style Award
|
|-
|Luis Fonsi & Adamari López
|Hottest Romance
|
|-
|rowspan=2|2007
|rowspan=2|Luis Fonsi
|Favorite Pop Star
|
|-
|He's Got Style Award
|
|-
|rowspan=14|2009
|rowspan=5|Luis Fonsi
|Voice of the Moment
|
|-
|Favorite Pop Artist
|
|-
|My Idol Is
|
|-
|What a Hottie!
|
|-
|He's Got Style Award
|
|-
|Adamari López and Luis Fonsi
|Hottest Romance
|
|-
|rowspan=4|"Aquí Estoy Yo" 
|The Perfect Combination
|
|-
|My favorite Video
|
|-
|Catchiest Tune
|
|-
|rowspan=2|Best Ballad
|
|-
|rowspan=3|"No Me Doy Por Vencido"
|
|-
|The Perfect Combination
|
|-
|My Ringtone
|
|-
|"Palabras del Silencio" 
|CD To Die For
|
|-
|rowspan=5|2010
|rowspan=4|Luis Fonsi
|Voice of the Moment
|
|-
|My Favorite Concert
|
|-
|Favorite Pop Artist
|
|-
|What a Hottie!
|
|-
|Adamari López and Luis Fonsi
|Hottest Romance
|
|-
|rowspan=7|2012
|rowspan=4|Luis Fonsi
|Follow me The Good
|
|-
|My Favorite Concert
|
|-
|Favorite Pop Artist
|
|-
|Best Moves
|
|-
|rowspan=2|"Tierra Firme" 
|Everything I touch it
|
|-
|My Favorite Concert
|
|-
|"Respira" 
|Best Ballad
|
|-
|rowspan=3|2017
|rowspan=3|"Despacito" 
|The Perfect Combination
|
|-
|Best Song For Singing
|
|-
|Best Song For perfection
| 
|-
|2019
|"Imposible" 
|Best Song: Singing in the Shower
|
|}

 Television Amantes de Luna Llena (2000); Special appearanceTaina (2001); Special appearanceCorazones al límite (2004); RoyLlena de amor (2010); Special appearanceThe Voice Chile (2015–16); CoachThe Tonight Show Starring Jimmy Fallon (2017, 2019); guest performerEl hormiguero (2017, 2018, 2018 (La Voz), 2019, 2020, 2021, 2021 (La Voz), 2022, 2022 (La Voz); Guest PerformerLip Sync Battle (2018); Episode: "Luis Fonsi vs. Joan Smalls"Drop the Mic (2018); Episode: "Seth Rogen vs. Joseph Gordon-Levitt / Terry Crews vs. Luis Fonsi"La Voz (2019-); Coach (with Wisin, Alejandra Guzmán, Carlos Vives)Songland (2020)
 The Voice (2021) with Kelly Clarkson's team23rd Annual Latin Grammy Awards (2022); Host'' (with Anitta, Laura Pausini, Thalía)

See also 

List of Puerto Ricans
List of composers by nationality
List of Puerto Rican songwriters

References

External links 
 Universal Music Latin Entertainment | Luis Fonsi
 Official website
 
 

1978 births
Living people
Dr. Phillips High School alumni
Florida State University alumni
Latin Grammy Award winners
Latin music songwriters
Latin pop singers
Male actors from San Juan, Puerto Rico
Puerto Rican male soap opera actors
Puerto Rican male telenovela actors
Puerto Rican pop singers
Puerto Rican reggaeton musicians
Puerto Rican singer-songwriters
Singers from San Juan, Puerto Rico
Universal Music Latin Entertainment artists
21st-century Puerto Rican male actors
21st-century Puerto Rican male singers
21st-century Puerto Rican singers